Jajigram (also referred to as Sripat Jajigram) is a village in Katwa I CD block in Katwa subdivision of Purba Bardhaman district in the Indian state of West Bengal.

Geography

Location

Urbanisation
88.44% of the population of Katwa subdivision live in the rural areas. Only 11.56% of the population live in the urban areas. The map alongside presents some of the notable locations in the subdivision. All places marked in the map are linked in the larger full screen map.

Demographics
As per the 2011 Census of India, Jajigram had a total population of 4,471 of which 2,287 (51%) were males and 2,184 (49%) were females. Population below 6 years was 593. The total number of literates in  Jajigram was 2,601 (67.07% of the population over 6 years).

Transport
Jajigram is at the junction of State Highway 14 and State Highway 6.

Education
Bengal Institute of Technology, Katwa is a polytechnic college at Jajigram.

Culture
Srinivasa Acarya is believed to have lived at Jajigram and his relics can still be seen at Sadhanpith.

References

Villages in Purba Bardhaman district